The  is a 8.3 km railway line owned by the Ichibata Electric Railway. The line connects Kawato Station with Izumo Taisha-mae Station, all within Izumo, Shimane Prefecture, Japan.

With the closure of JR West's Taisha Line in 1990, this line became the only line connecting passengers to the Izumo-taisha.

Operations
The line is electrified with overhead lines and is single-tracked for the entire line. No passing loops exist on the line.

Though the line terminates at Kawato Station, some services continue along the Kita-Matsue Line to Matsue Shinjiko-Onsen Station. There are local, express, and limited express services that run along on the line, along with the Izumotaisha express service.

Stations
All stations are within Izumo, Shimane.

References

Bataden Taisha Line
Railway lines in Japan
Rail transport in Shimane Prefecture
Railway lines opened in 1930